A teddy, also called a camiknicker, is a garment which covers the torso and crotch in the one garment. It is a similar style of garment to a one-piece swimsuit or bodysuit, but is typically looser and sheerer. The garment is put on by stepping into the leg holes and pulling the garment up to cover the torso. It may cover the whole of the torso or partially and may also cover the arms. They may open at the crotch so that the wearer may use the bathroom without taking it completely off. As an undergarment, it combines the functions of a camisole and panties, and may be preferred to avoid a visible panty line. It is also found as lingerie.

History 

A one-piece undergarment which combined a camisole and knickers appeared in the 1910s under the name envelope chemise or camiknickers. It was considered an appropriate garment to wear under the shorter dresses which came into fashion in the 1920s. The garment was also worn without an overgarment in the boudoir.  

The style gained popularity during World War II when women who served in military-related duties wore trousers instead of skirts. By the late 1940s, the garment lost its popularity. 

A version reappeared as a lingerie garment in the late 1960s, featuring a bra top and attached slip, to wear under short, shift dresses, and replace half slips. Often the bra top was an underwire style, and the entire garment was sized by the bra. It was called both a "teddy" or "braslip", usually in traditional lingerie colors, and young women especially liked them.

Another revival began in the 1980s and 1990s, under the name "teddy" or "bodysuit", when the garment was made of spandex, featuring brief construction combining features of a bra and panties, or leotard, and brighter colors.

Modern teddy styles 

Most modern teddies are either designed for visual or sex appeal, or as practical clothing. Common teddy styles today include:

Bareback teddy 
A bareback teddy is one with an open back, often designed with built-in bust support.

Body briefer teddy 
A body briefer is a form-fitting garment which smooths and shapes the wearer's figure. They typically come in a variety of control levels, achieved by using different materials or thicknesses things of materials in the body areas they are designed to control. Like sleep teddies, body briefers tend to use simpler materials and styles than teddies designed for visual appeal. Body briefers are also commonly referred to as "body shapers" or "women's shapers".

Fashion top teddy 
A fashion top teddy combines a thong or T-front thong panty, bra and fashion top. Fashion top teddies come in a wide variety of styles, from simple styles with plain materials to very fancy styles with beads, crystals or sequins. Fashion top teddies can be worn as fancy undergarments or as an outer garment without a top over them.

Sleep teddy 
A sleep teddy is a loose-fitting teddy designed as sleepwear. A sleep teddy is a practical garment which tends to use simpler materials and styles.

Teddiette 
A teddiette is a teddy with detachable garters.

Traditional teddy 
A traditional teddy is a loose-fitting teddy designed for visual or sex appeal and to show off the wearer's figure. Traditional teddies often use sheer or partially sheer material.

References 

Lingerie
Women's clothing